Richard Steele (born March 30, 2004) is a Northern Mariana Islands association footballer who currently plays for the Park–Gilbert Buccaneers and the Northern Mariana Islands national team.

Youth career
As a youth Steele played for MP United for over ten years and won the top scorer award in local leagues multiple times. He was part of the MP United squad that won back-to-back U12 division titles in 2014 and 2015. Through 2016 he also played as a goalkeeper and won the Golden Gloves Award for the U12 division that season. In 2017 he was tied for fourth in scoring in the  Northern Mariana Islands Football Association U14 division. That year he also competed with MPU in the Pacific Ocean Cup in Numazu, Japan. In 2019 he won the Golden Boot of the under-15 league with twenty three goals.

Following the 2019 season his family moved to California where he competed with the Pirates of Santa Ynez Valley Union High School. He was named the team's Best Offensive Player after his first season as the team's top scorer with five goals. While in California he also played club soccer for Kickers Soccer Club in Los Olivos. He was also the club's U16 top scorer that season, scoring twelves times. 

After one year in California Steele returned to the Northern Mariana Islands and resumed playing with MP United and the national team player pool. In 2021 he moved to Teen Ayuyu of the M-League. Following the season he was one of sixteen players named to the league's All-Star team that competed against the Northern Mariana Islands national team in the All-Star Game.

College career
In February 2022, as a senior at Mount Carmel School, Steele committed to play college soccer in the United States for the Wolves of Walla Walla University, a member of the NAIA. However, later that year it was announced that Steele instead opted to join the Park–Gilbert Buccaneers beginning with the 2023–2024 season. He was joined in the squad by national teammates Jeremiah Diaz and Dev Bachani.

International career
Steele was a member of the national under-18 player pool. He made his senior international debut on 19 February 2022 in a friendly against Guam. As part of the same trip, he scored for the national under-20 team in a 4–1 victory against the Guam national under-17 team. 

Later in 2022, Steele was named to the under-20 squad again for 2023 AFC U-20 Asian Cup qualification held in Jordan.

International career statistics

References

External links

2004 births
Living people
Association football forwards
Northern Mariana Islands footballers
Northern Mariana Islands international footballers